Manchester–Boston Regional Airport , commonly referred to as Manchester Airport, is a public use airport  south of the central business district of Manchester, New Hampshire, United States on the border of Hillsborough and Rockingham counties. It is owned by the City of Manchester, and is in the southern part of the city on the border with Londonderry, New Hampshire.

Opened in 1927, Manchester–Boston Regional Airport is by far the busiest airport in New Hampshire, with ten times the traffic of the next-busiest, Portsmouth. It is the only airport in the state with substantial commercial service. It is also New England's fifth-largest airport by passenger volume, behind Boston Logan in Massachusetts; Bradley International in Connecticut; T. F. Green in Rhode Island; and Portland International Jetport in Maine. It moved more than 1 million passengers in a year for the first time in 1997. After years of growth, it handled 4.33 million passengers in 2005, its peak year. Passenger tallies have declined since then, similarly with many regional airports; it handled 1.85 million passengers in 2018, and traffic fell sharply during the COVID-19 pandemic. 

It is included in the Federal Aviation Administration (FAA) National Plan of Integrated Airport Systems for 2021–2025, in which it is categorized as a small hub primary commercial service facility. Certified for Cat III B Instrument Landing operations, the airport has a reputation for never surrendering to bad weather. The airport has closed only once, when the national airspace was shut down for two days following the September 11 terrorist attacks, after which all American airports were required to close. It is home to the Aviation Museum of New Hampshire, built around an Art Deco control tower, and its terminal opened in 1938.

Use

Manchester–Boston is New England's third-largest cargo airport behind Connecticut's Bradley International, which is a hub for UPS Airlines, and Logan in Boston. FedEx and UPS both serve Manchester with cargo-specific jets, including the Airbus A300, Douglas DC-10, and Boeing 767 by FedEx and UPS.

UPS uses Manchester to "feed" the rest of northern New England by contracting with Wiggins Airways,
which flies smaller prop-driven planes to places like Portland, Augusta, Bangor, Presque Isle, Rutland, and other communities. To handle this "regional sort," UPS built a sorting facility where packages coming in from the company's Louisville hub are redistributed to trucks or to the Wiggins feeder aircraft. 

FedEx previously used Manchester as a regional sorting station as well but now supports the northern New England destinations via direct flights from Memphis, Tennessee to Portland and Burlington. A contract with the Postal Service fills the FedEx jets (coming from hubs in Memphis and Indianapolis) with mail in addition to the typical assortment of express and overnight packages. DHL previously operated a 727-200 on a Wilmington, Ohio-Allentown, Pennsylvania-Manchester-Wilmington routing, but that service has since ceased.

In November 2022, Amazon Air operated by Atlas Air began flying into Manchester utilizing Boeing 767 aircraft from Fort Worth Alliance Airport and Cincinnati/Northern Kentucky International Airport. A nightly flight goes from Fort Worth Alliance Airport-Manchester-Cincinnati/Northern Kentucky International Airport in the early morning hours.

Facility and operations

For the 12-month period ending April 30, 2021, the airport had 32,845 aircraft operations, an average of 90 per day: 33% commercial, 26% air taxi, 39% general aviation and 2% military. In November 2021, there were 89 aircraft based at this airport: 50 single-engine, 21 multi-engine, 12 jet and 6 helicopter.

History

The Manchester airport was founded in June 1927, when the city's Board of Mayor and Aldermen put $15,000 towards the project. By October, a board of aviation had been founded, and ground was broken at an  site near Pine Island Pond. It took only a month for two  runways to be constructed. The board of aviation convinced George G. "Scotty" Wilson, a barnstormer operating out of Boston, to move to New Hampshire and start Manchester's first flying service. After the formation of Northeast Airways at the site in 1933, the first passenger terminal was built.

In 1940, as the U.S. entered World War II, the airport was chosen as an Army Air Force base. At its peak, some 6,000 troops were stationed there, including the 45th Bombardment Group – which practiced bombing runs on what is now New Boston Air Force Station – and an anti-submarine squadron that destroyed at least two Nazi subs off the U.S. Atlantic coast. It was renamed Grenier Field after Manchester native Lt. Jean B. Grenier, who died in a training mission in 1934. Civilian use returned in 1951 when Northeast Airways resumed flights.

The current Manchester airport began to take shape as a joint civil-military facility in the 1960s. A new civilian terminal and the first modern air traffic control tower in New Hampshire were constructed in 1961. Businessman Roscoe A. Ammon donated $500,000 for the construction of the new air terminal. In 1966, the Air Force removed its remaining forces and closed Grenier Air Force Base, leaving the airport open for expansion. In 1978 the airfield was renamed Manchester Airport.

Throughout the 1960s and 1970s, the airport was served by Northeast Airlines with the Convair CV-240, Douglas DC-9, and Fokker FH-227. Delta Air Lines absorbed Northeast in 1972 and continued to serve the airport with the DC-9 until 1978, then Boeing 727-200s until 1980 when it discontinued service at Manchester. 

In the mid-1980s, airlines once again started offering jet service out of Manchester. United Airlines inaugurated service at Manchester in 1983 with two daily flights to Chicago–O'Hare. This was part of their 50 States campaign, which positioned United as the only carrier to serve all 50 states with mainline service. The Boeing 727 and Boeing 737 were initially used on the Chicago flights, which would often make intermediate stops in cities like Providence, Albany, Syracuse, and Burlington to pick up or drop off passengers. Manchester was also a "tag-on" for United flights heading from Bangor and Portland, Maine to Chicago, but the carrier no longer serves either city with mainline aircraft.

In the early 1990s, United Airlines began flights between Manchester and Washington Dulles International Airport near Washington, D.C. But creation of a north–south hub at Dulles did not work for United, and heavy competition in this market led to a quick exit. The Boeing 737 was used for this short-lived service, which comprised about four daily circuits between the two airports. US Airways started service at Manchester in early 1986, by connecting their hubs at Pittsburgh and Philadelphia. The carrier used the DC-9, BAC 111, and 737-200 aircraft. Both carriers expanded service at Manchester over the years with larger planes and more flights. United now runs a strict non-stop schedule to and from Chicago with no intermediate stops or tag-ons. The 757 has been used by both United and US Airways at Manchester, which stands as the largest passenger-carrying plane to serve the airport in scheduled service. The Airbus A320 series of aircraft is also commonly used by United, Northwest Airlines (merged with Delta Air Lines), and occasionally by US Airways. In April 2010, Delta enhanced service to Manchester; it dropped its daily CRJ-700 service to Atlanta and replaced the aircraft with an MD-88 with seating for 149. Delta also switched all its Delta Connection service to Detroit with mainline service on DC-9's. On October 7, 2021, Spirit Airlines began serving Manchester with the Airbus A320, making it one of 3 airlines regularly serving Manchester with mainline aircraft. Southwest serves Manchester with the Boeing 737-700 and the Boeing 737-800. American flies the Airbus A319/20 from Charlotte.

Expansion

In 1992, a long-term expansion and improvement plan started to take shape. Two years later, a new  terminal designed by HNTB and Lavallee Brensinger opened, providing ample room for larger jets. The airport continued to expand, opening a new parking garage and parking lots in the next years, as well as working to reconstruct the runways and taxiways. In 1998, these expansions paid off, with MetroJet, Northwest, and Southwest all beginning service. The airport prospered from the "Southwest Effect", in which competing airlines increase service and decrease fares to compete with the low-cost carrier. Throughout the 1990s, Manchester outpaced almost every other similarly sized airport in terms of passenger growth.

In April 2006, the aldermen of the city of Manchester voted to change the name of the airport to "Manchester–Boston Regional Airport" in an effort to increase its visibility to travelers around the country.

Decline in passengers 

In 2006 the airport started to experience a decrease in passengers flying through its facility, with service to only twelve cities. In 2017, the airport served the fewest passengers since 1998. Southwest as of 2021 has diminished service to four cities, with Delta Air Lines serving Atlanta once daily instead of twice. In 2020 they consolidated the service to Boston. United Airlines cancelled their O'Hare service in July 2018, making Newark their only destination from Manchester, which was replaced by Washington Dulles in March 2019.

The decline in service is due to increased activity at Logan International Airport in Boston and to mergers between airlines, which led to decreased flights. When Southwest entered Logan in 2009, it also significantly reduced prices at Logan, prompting more people to fly out of Boston rather than Manchester.

Current service

In 2019, American Airlines announced service to Chicago O'Hare after United discontinued its O'Hare service. United announced service to Washington-Dulles instead of Newark in March 2019.

The airport administration hired a new airport director to help it bring back passengers to Manchester, as well as to help bring in new airlines and destinations. In November 2020, Delta Airlines announced that they would be discontinuing service to MHT. On February 9, 2021 Aeroterm announced that they would develop a new cargo facility at the airport.

On June 16, 2021, Spirit Airlines announced they would be starting service to four Florida cities in October; they later announced that seasonal service to Myrtle Beach would start April 2022.
Spirit is the first new airline to begin service at Manchester-Boston since Air Canada in 2004.

On November 9, 2021, the airport announced that United is discontinuing service to Washington Dulles January 4, 2022, once again leaving Newark as the only destination from Manchester, NH on United.

In November 2022, Amazon Air, operated by Atlas Air, began service from Cincinnati/Northern Kentucky International Airport utilizing Boeing 767 aircraft; current operations now include a flight from 
Perot Field Fort Worth Alliance Airport, which then continues to Cincinnati/Northern Kentucky International Airport.

Airlines and destinations

Passenger

Destinations map

Cargo

Statistics

Top destinations

Carrier shares

Annual traffic

Ground transport

Highway access
In 2007, construction began on Raymond Wieczorek Drive (then known as Manchester Airport Access Road), an expressway connection from the F.E. Everett Turnpike. Before this project, access to the airport was limited to local roads off Interstate 293/NH Route 101. The access road opened on November 10, 2011, connecting the airport and NH Route 3A in Litchfield with the Everett Turnpike and U.S. Route 3 in Bedford.

Manchester Shuttle
From November 13, 2006, to June 30, 2008, the airport operated a shuttle bus — free to ticketed passengers — that ran every two hours, 24 hours a day, to the Anderson Regional Transportation Center in Woburn, Massachusetts (45 minutes), on to the Sullivan Square subway station in Boston (75 minutes), and back to the airport via Woburn. The free service shut down after a private company, Flight Line Inc., began operating a paid service along similar routes on July 1, 2008. Flight Line offers hourly service between the airport, several points in northern Massachusetts, and the city of Boston for $39 each way. Reservations are required.

Greyhound Lines
Greyhound buses offer three trips daily from Manchester Airport on its Boston–Montreal service. Buses serve Concord and Hanover in New Hampshire; White River Junction, Montpelier, and Burlington in Vermont; and Saint-Jean-sur-Richelieu and Montreal in Quebec, Canada, when going northbound. They serve South Station and Logan International Airport in Boston on the southbound trips.

Local bus service
The Manchester Transit Authority provides hourly bus service between the passenger terminal and downtown Manchester.

Commuter Rail extension
A proposed extension of the MBTA Commuter Rail system's Lowell Line would see trains that currently terminate at Lowell running as far north as Manchester. The proposed Bedford/MHT Station would be constructed across the Merrimack River in Bedford underneath Raymond Wieczorek Drive, and would be intended to serve the airport and the town of Bedford.

The New Hampshire State Rail Plan of 2012 stated that freight could also be viable on the rail extension, perhaps opening up more freight opportunities for the airport.

Law enforcement / security
The town of Londonderry's police are responsible for law enforcement and security operations at the airport terminal. The sheriff's department of Rockingham County was responsible for law enforcement operations at the airport until 2006 when the Londonderry Police Department was awarded the new security contract.

Fire Department/ARFF Service
The Airport Fire Department is manned 24 hours a day/7 days a week consisting of 4 on duty personnel who work a 48 hour work week. All personnel are fully qualified NFPA structural firefighters and have acquired a follow on specialized course in Aircraft Rescue Firefighting. All employees are certified National Registry Emergency Medical Technicians ranging from the basic level through paramedic.

Incidents

Pre-Jet Age
On June 3, 1928, at 3:02 pm, Lt. George Wilson's Curtiss OX-5 nosedived  and crashed at the south end of the airport while landing before thousands of onlookers. Wilson received a gash on the face, and one passenger was pinned in the wreckage and sustained shock, cuts and bruises. The cause of the crash was a motor failure, and the plane was badly crumpled with its nose buried deeply in a swamp.

On February 19, 1933, Real N. Bourke died when the Arrow Sport two-seater he had hired from Northeast Airways burst into flames a quarter mile north of Manchester Airport on the Boone Farm. He had made a number of steep banks and wing-overs, and his landing gear struck a gully prior to the crash. It was Manchester's first fatality.

The plane belonged to Donald Lewis, who was at the controls and suffered major injuries. Lilly later died on August 12, 1938.

On December 10, 1942, a fighter plane connected to Manchester Airport (Grenier Field) crashed in Mont Vernon around noon; the unidentified pilot was uninjured.

On April 24, 1944, at 9:00 am, a four-motored Army B-24 Liberator bomber (#42-5111) took off from Manchester Airport and crashed into a densely wooded area on Fort Mountain near Epsom, killing all ten crew on board.

It had taken off from Manchester and was headed to Gander, Newfoundland, Canada.

On August 5, 1948, at 5:00 pm, an AT-11 training plane and an A-26 attack bomber collided over Manchester airport, killing four.

On June 7, 1949, at 8:43 pm, 1st Lt. William A. Primm of the 97th Fighter Squadron died during a routine training flight when he attempted an emergency landing and crashed his F-51 fighter at the end of Runway 24.

Post-Jet Age
On April 22, 1971, at 5:00 pm, an 18-year-old single-engine Beechcraft Bonanza, registered to New England Aviation Corp., crashed during takeoff, killing four people (one crew, three passengers).

On July 31, 1973, Delta Air Lines Flight 723 from Burlington, Vermont to Boston was diverted to Manchester to pick up passengers stranded by a flight cancellation. After leaving Manchester it continued to Boston, but during landing there the McDonnell Douglas DC-9-31 hit a sea wall at the end of Runway 4, killing 83 passengers and six crew.

On October 3, 1979, a small private plane carrying Agnetha Fältskog of the Swedish pop band ABBA was traveling on one of the last legs of their 1979 North American tour (New York City to Boston). The plane flew through one of the worst severe storms in recent Connecticut history. It is speculated that the plane may have encountered a tornado during this event. It was able to make a diversion to Manchester landing on a second attempt while low on fuel. This was a key moment in starting Fältskog's fear of air travel.

On November 2, 1990, US Airways Flight 506 to Pittsburgh collided with a flock of birds after takeoff. No one was injured and the DC-9 returned safely to MHT.

On January 22, 1991, at 10:10 am, Continental Express Flight 3550 from Newark went off runway 7. No one was injured and the cause of the crash was ruled to be a hydraulic steering mechanism failure.

On September 23, 2020, Air Force 2, a modified Boeing 757 carrying then US Vice President Mike Pence on a flight from Manchester to Washington, D.C., suffered a bird strike while climbing out of the airport. The airplane returned safely and the former Vice President and his staff flew out on a cargo airplane later that day. No injuries were reported as a result of the incident.

On January 19, 2021, a Piper Malibu Meridian (Reg: N641WA) flying in from Olathe, Kansas, skidded off the runway while landing, and emergency services were dispatched to the aircraft's location. The pilot and passengers all made it out with no major injuries.

On December 10, 2021, a Castle Air Swearingen Metroliner, flying in from Essex County Airport in New Jersey, crashed into the western bank of the Merrimack River, while attempting to land on runway 6 around 11:30 pm. The pilot, who was the sole occupant, was killed upon impact.

On January 5, 2022, a FedEx Boeing 767 Bound for Memphis Slid off Taxiway H due to an ice storm and struck the airport’s anemometer around 9:00am. No injuries were reported and the left wing of the plane received moderate damage. This event led to a three hour long shutdown of airport operations.

Solar panels
In 2012, south-facing solar panels were installed on the roof of the parking garage, but they caused so much glare for the nearby control tower for 45 minutes each morning that they were removed, and later replaced with 2,210 panels (460 kW AC) that were reoriented to the east to eliminate the glare. The airport expects to save $100,000 each year on electricity by having the solar panels. The efficiency of east or west facing panels is reduced by about 10%, so more panels were added so the total generation would be about the same. The array is expected to generate about 585,000 kWh each year.

References

External links

Airports in New Hampshire
Airports established in 1927
Transportation buildings and structures in Hillsborough County, New Hampshire
Buildings and structures in Manchester, New Hampshire
Transportation buildings and structures in Rockingham County, New Hampshire
Historic American Engineering Record in New Hampshire
Londonderry, New Hampshire